P. salicifolia may refer to:
 Prunus salicifolia, the capulin, a cherry tree species
 Pyrus salicifolia, a pear tree species native to the Middle East

synonyms
 Psychotria salicifolia, a synonym for Psychotria papantlensis, a tree species in the genus Psychotria

See also
 Salicifolia (disambiguation)